The 2008 British Academy Scotland Awards were held on 9 November 2008 at the Glasgow City Halls, honouring the best Scottish film and television productions of 2008. Presented by BAFTA Scotland, accolades are handed out for the best in feature-length film that were screened at British cinemas during 2008. The Nominees were announced on 17 October 2008. The ceremony was hosted by Edith Bowman.

Winners and nominees

Winners are listed first and highlighted in boldface.
{| class=wikitable
|-
! style="background:#EEDD82; width:50%" | Best Feature Film
! style="background:#EEDD82; width:50%" | Best Director in Film/Television
|-
| valign="top" |
Summer
 Stone of Destiny
 Outpost
| valign="top" |
Kenneth Glenaan – Summer
 Iain Davidson– Gary's War
 Roger Gartlands – Rebus (TV series)
 Adrian Shergold – Fiona's Story
|-
! style="background:#EEDD82; width:50%" | Best Acting Performance (Film)
! style="background:#EEDD82; width:50%" | Best Short Film
|-
| valign="top" |
Brian Cox – The Escapist
 Alia Alzougbi – Trouble Sleeping
 Robert Carlyle – Summer
| valign="top" |
Ma Bar
 Irene
 Island
|-
! style="background:#EEDD82; width:50%" | Best Acting Performance (Television)
! style="background:#EEDD82; width:50%" | Best Animation
|-
| valign="top" |
Ken Stott – Hancock and Joan as Tony Hancock
 Ashley Jensen – Ugly Betty as Christina McKinney
 Gina McKee – Fiona's Story as Fiona
 Peter Mullan – Boy A as Terry
| valign="top" |
The World According To
 Bill's Visitors
 Tongue of the Hidden
|-
! style="background:#EEDD82; width:50%" | Best Writer Film/Television
! style="background:#EEDD82; width:50%" | Best Entertainment Programme
|-
| valign="top" |
Bryan Elsley – Skins
 Greg McHugh – Gary's War
 Steven Moffat - 'Doctor Who| valign="top" |Gary's War – (The Comedy Unit) Delta Forever – (BBC Three)
 Still Game Christmas Special – (BBC Two)
|-
! style="background:#EEDD82; width:50%" | Best Factual Series
! style="background:#EEDD82; width:50%" | Best Factual Programme
|-
| valign="top" |The Genius of Charles Darwin – (Channel 4) Britain's Lost World – (BBC One)
 The Man who Cycled the World – (BBC Two)
| valign="top" |Parallel Worlds, Parallel Lives – (BBC Four) Alison Watt - A Painter's Eye – (BBC Two)
 Mum and Me – (BBC One)
|-
! style="background:#EEDD82; width:50%" | Best Television Drama
! style="background:#EEDD82; width:50%" | Best Multimedia
|-
| valign="top" |Phoo Action – (BBC Three) Fiona's Story – (BBC One)
| valign="top" |Grand Theft Auto IV London Transport Museum Slabovia.tv|-
! style="background:#EEDD82; width:50%" | Best News And Current Affairs Programme
! style="background:#EEDD82; width:50%" | Best Children's Programme
|-
| valign="top" |'Britain's Protection Racket – (BBC Scotland) Wasted Nation – (BBC Scotland)
| valign="top" |Hedz – (CBBC) Nina and the Neurons – (CBeebies)
 Raven - The Secret Temple – (CBBC)
|-
! style="background:#EEDD82; width:50%" | Best Scottish Presenter (Audience Choice)
|-
| valign="top" |Lorraine Kelly Sean Batty
 Hazel Irvine
 Jim McColl
 Gordon Ramsay
 Carol Smillie
|-
|}

Outstanding Contribution to FilmMike Alexander & Mark LittlewoodOutstanding Contribution to Craft (In Memory of Robert McCann)Morag Ross'''

See also
BAFTA Scotland
62nd British Academy Film Awards
81st Academy Awards
15th Screen Actors Guild Awards
29th Golden Raspberry Awards

References

External links
BAFTA Scotland Home page

2008
BAF
British Academy Scotland
2000s in Glasgow
BAF
BAF
BAF
Scotland
British Academy Scotland